Morgen is a former unit of measurement, from the German and Dutch word meaning morning, which denoted the amount of land that could be plowed in a morning's time.

Morgen may also refer to:

People
 Brett Morgen (born 1968), an American film director
 Curt von Morgen (1858–1928), a Prussian explorer and general
 Georg Konrad Morgen (1909–1982), a German judge
 Morgan le Fay, a character in British Arthurian legend, "Morgen" being one of several variant spellings
 Morgen Witzel (born 1960), a Canadian historian and business theorist
 Sandra Morgen (1950–2016), an American feminist anthropologist

Media
 De Morgen, a Flemish newspaper
 Der Morgen, a former German newspaper
 Morgen (film), a 2010 Romanian film
 Morgen Freiheit, former Yiddish-language newspaper in New York
 Morgen schon, German television series

Music
 Morgen, a psychedelic rock band from Long Island, New York
 "Morgen!", an 1894 song by Richard Strauss
 "Morgen" (Ivo Robić song), a 1959 German song
 "Morgen" (Ronnie Tober song), a 1968 Dutch song and Eurovision Song Contest entry
 Morgen und Abend, an opera by Georg Friedrich Haas

Other uses
 Morgen, former unit of measurement
 Morgen (mythological creature), a Welsh or Breton water-sprite

See also
 Morgan (disambiguation)

German words and phrases
fr:Matin
Surnames from nicknames